Brignolizomus is a genus of hubbardiid short-tailed whipscorpions, first described by Mark Harvey in 2000. It contains three species distributed in Australia (Queensland); Brignolizomus nob, Brignolizomus walteri and Brignolizomus woodwardi.

References 

Schizomida genera
Animals described in 1992
Arachnids of Australia